This is a list of lists of covered bridges in North America.

References

Covered